Lauren Arikan (born December 14, 1984) is a Republican member of the Maryland House of Delegates. She represents District 7, which covers parts of Baltimore County and Harford County.

Early life and career 
Arikan was born in Ellicott City, Maryland on December 14, 1984. She is a member of the Turkish-American community. She attended McDaniel College in Westminster, Maryland and the University of Baltimore in Baltimore, Maryland. Since 2009, she has worked at her family's businesses, Arikan Accounting and Tax, Arikan Acres, and Arikan Investments. She is married and lives on an eight-acre chicken and dairy goat farm in Jarrettsville, Maryland with her husband, Yusuf, and their four children.

Arikan first got involved in politics in 2012 by becoming a member of the Board of Directors for the Maryland Friends of Midwives organization. From 2015 to 2018, she served as the chair of the Love Maryland PAC. In February 2018, Arikan filed to run for the Maryland House of Delegates in District 7. She won the Republican primary with 13.6 percent of the vote, coming in third place in a field of thirteen candidates. She defeated Democrats Allison Berkowitz and Gordon Koerner and Green Party candidate Ryan Sullivan in the general election, receiving 23.3 percent of the vote.

In the legislature 
Arikan was sworn into the Maryland House of Delegates on January 9, 2019. She was assigned to the Judiciary Committee by House Speaker Michael E. Busch. In 2021, she was elected to serve as vice president of the Women Legislators of Maryland caucus. She left the caucus in 2022 after its members voted to elect Delegate Lesley Lopez as its new president over Arikan, who was in line to become its next president.

In August 2021, Arikan filed a complaint with the Maryland State Board of Elections against Michael Steele, who had formed a 527 committee to raise money for his exploratory effort in the 2022 gubernatorial election. Steele's campaign dismissed these allegations, calling them "completely meritless" and accusing Arikan of supporting Dan Cox in the Republican primary. Arikan denied these claims, saying that she intended to stay "completely out of the gubernatorial Republican primary".

Political positions

Abortion 
In March 2022, Arikan proposed an amendment to abortion rights legislation that would ban abortion services based on the gender of the fetus. The amendment failed by a vote of 40-86.

Alcohol 
In March 2020, Arikan voted against a measure to kill legislation that would allow for liquor sales in Baltimore County on Sundays. The measure was approved by a vote of 14-4.

Education 
Arikan opposes mask mandates in schools. In August 2021, she attended an anti-mask rally outside a meeting for the Harford County school board.

Arikan introduced legislation during the 2021 legislative session that would allow parents living in districts that do not offer full in-person instruction by Fall 2021 to apply to receive the amount the state spends per child in public school to spend on private school tuition.

Arikan opposed legislation introduced in the 2022 legislative session that would create an Institute for Public Leadership at the University of Maryland.

Elections 
Arikan supports the use of voter IDs in elections and placing restrictions on mail-in voting.

Housing 
Arikan opposed legislation that would temporarily place restrictions on when landlords could evict their tenants until April 2022, and another that would guarantee low-income tenants a right to counsel in eviction cases, saying that she would sell her rental properties if the bills were enacted, instead investing in rental property in Pennsylvania.

Social issues 
Arikan supports midwifery and is the founder of the Birth Circle of Baltimore.

Arikan opposed legislation that would ban threats made against health officials and hospital workers, saying that she received death threats during her first session in the General Assembly but "nothing ever came of it" after reporting it to law enforcement.

Electoral history

References

1984 births
Living people
Republican Party members of the Maryland House of Delegates
Women state legislators in Maryland
People from Ellicott City, Maryland
McDaniel College alumni
University of Baltimore alumni
21st-century American politicians
21st-century American women politicians